Mahmoud Yazbak is an Israeli Arab academic. He is the first Arab elected as President of the Middle East & Islamic Studies Association of Israel, (MEISAI), the main scholarly association of researchers on the Middle East and Islam in Israel.

Yazbak earned his Ph.D. in Middle Eastern Studies from Hebrew University of Jerusalem in 1996. Yazbak is a lecturer at the University of Haifa. He specializes in Palestinian social history.

Yazbak is a board member of the Adalah since 2004.

He is the father of Heba Yazbak, member of the Knesset for Balad.

Books

References

Israeli Arab historians
Academic staff of the University of Haifa
Historians of the Middle East
Palestinian academics
Living people
Year of birth missing (living people)